Calliotropis pelseneeri is a species of sea snail, a marine gastropod mollusk in the family Eucyclidae.

Subspecies
 Calliotropis pelseneeri pelseneeri Cernohorsky, 1977
 Calliotropis pelseneeri rossiana Dell, 1990 (species inquirenda)

Description
The shell attains a height of 11 mm.

Distribution
This marine species occurs in the Weddell Sea and the Bellingshausen Sea, Antarctica

References

 Vilvens C. & Sellanes J. (2010). Description of Calliotropis ceciliae new species (Gastropoda: Chilodontidae: Calliotropinae) from off Chile. The Nautilus 124(2):107–111
 Engl W. (2012) Shells of Antarctica. Hackenheim: Conchbooks. 402 pp.

External links

pelseneeri
Gastropods described in 1977